Ghosts of Port Arthur is a 1933 Australian short documentary directed by Ken G. Hall. It was described as a "travel fantasy" which focuses on the history of the penal settlement at Port Arthur.

It includes sections on New Norfolk, Hobart, Port Arthur, the Hobart Zoo and the Derwent River district.

Reception
The film was released as a support item. The Adelaide News called it a "fine travel talk".

References

External links
Ghosts of Port Arthur at Australian Screen Online
Ghosts of Port Arthur at IMDb

1933 documentary films
1933 films
Films directed by Ken G. Hall
Australian black-and-white films
Australian documentary films